The women's 3000 meter at the 2014 KNSB Dutch Single Distance Championships took place in Heerenveen at the Thialf ice skating rink on Saturday 26 October 2013. Although this tournament was held in 2013, it was part of the 2013–2014 speed skating season.

There were 20 participants.

Title holder was Diane Valkenburg.

The first 5 skaters qualified for the next following 2013–14 ISU Speed Skating World Cup tournaments.

Overview

Result

Draw

Source:

References

Single Distance Championships
2014 Single Distance
World